Shane King may refer to:

Shane King (Gaelic footballer), Fermanagh Football Team 1996
Shane King (politician), Australian politician
Shayne King, racing driver